The Haseltine Cobblestone House is a Greek Revival-styled home clad in cobblestone and built in 1842 in Big Bend, Waukesha County, Wisconsin for one of the town's first settlers.

History
The house was built for Orien Haseltine, originally of Andover, Vermont. His family would be the first settlers of Vernon, Wisconsin. The house was listed on the National Register of Historic Places in 1980 and on the State Register of Historic Places in 1989.

References

Houses on the National Register of Historic Places in Wisconsin
National Register of Historic Places in Waukesha County, Wisconsin
Houses in Waukesha County, Wisconsin
Greek Revival architecture in Wisconsin
Cobblestone architecture
Houses completed in 1842